Muharrem Saruhan Hünel (born 7 January 1970) is a Turkish actor. His mother is of Arab descent who moved from Baghdad to Turkey. His father is of Albanian descent and is a dancer. He has a sister, Aslı Hünel, who is a singer. Hünel started his career through modeling. He made his cinematic debut in 1993 with a role in Yasak Sokaklar, and appeared in the movies Ufukta Bir Ağaç and Somuncu Baba: Aşkın Sırrı. In 1992, he had his first TV role with Gündüzün Karanlığı. He was noted with his leading role in the series Aynalı Tahir and gained more fame through his role in Karagül. Between 2019–2020, Hünel portrayed the character of Alişar in the historical drama Kuruluş: Osman.

Filmography

Film 
 Somuncu Baba: Aşkın Sırrı (2016) - Abdurrahman Erzincani
 Yasak Sokaklar (1993)
 Ufukta Bir Ağaç (1993)

Television 
 Yalnız Kurt (2022–)
 Kuruluş: Osman (2019–2020) - Alişar Bey
 Karagül (2015) - Kenan
 Oğurlanmış Arzular (2013)
 Araf Zamanı (2012) - Ali
 Yeni Baştan (2009)
 Serçe (2008) - Doğu
 Kaybolan Yıllar (2006–2007) - Esmer
 Melek (2002) - Ferhat
 Aynalı Tahir (1997) - Tilki Ekrem
 Tatlı Betüş (1993) -
 Gündüzün Karanlığı (1992)

References

External links 
 
 

1970 births
Turkish male film actors
Turkish male television actors
Living people
Turkish people of Arab descent
Turkish people of Albanian descent
Male actors from Istanbul